This is a list of recoilless rifles (RCLs) intended to catalogue these lightweight infantry support weapons that allow the firing of a heavier projectile than would be practical with a recoiling artillery gun. Technically, only devices that use a rifled barrel are recoilless rifles. The smoothbore variants (those devoid of rifling) are termed recoilless guns. This distinction is often lost, and both are often called recoilless rifles.

Normally used for anti-tank roles, the first effective system of this kind was developed during World War II to provide infantry with a light, cheap and easily deployable weapon that does not require extensive training in gunnery. The near complete lack of recoil allows some versions to be shoulder-fired, but the majority are mounted on light tripods and are intended to be easily carried by a soldier.

Citations and notes

References

Recoilless rifles